CNR Bridge is a swing railway bridge over the Fraser River in New Westminster, British Columbia, Canada.

CNR Bridge may also refer to:

Prince George CNR Bridge, Prince George, British Columbia, Canada
Cisco Bridges, a pair of railroad bridges at Siska, near Lytton, British Columbia, Canada
Lytton CNR Fraser Bridge, Lytton, British Columbia, Canada
Lytton CNR Thompson Bridge, Lytton, British Columbia, Canada
Vandorf Sideroad CNR Bridge, Whitchurch-Stouffville, Ontario, Canada
CNR Bonnet Carré Spillway-Baton Rouge Bridge, St. Charles Parish, Louisiana, U.S.
CNR bridge replaced by the Senator Sid Buckwold Bridge, Saskatoon, Saskatchewan, Canada

See also
Canadian National Railway
List of bridges in Canada